The Cross of Valour is a decoration that is, within the Canadian system of honours, the second highest award (surpassed only by the Victoria Cross), the highest honour available for Canadian civilians, and the highest of the three Canadian Bravery Decorations. Created in 1972, the medallion is presented to individuals, both Canadians and foreigners, living and deceased, who have performed acts of the most conspicuous courage in circumstances of extreme peril and grants recipients the ability to use the post-nominal letters CV.

History
The Cross of Valour was conceived of as a replacement for the Order of Canada's Medal of Courage, which had never been awarded since its creation in 1967. On the advice of her Cabinet headed by Prime Minister Pierre Trudeau, the Cross of Valour was initiated on 1 May 1972 by Queen Elizabeth II, and presented for the first time on 20 July of the same year. Prior to 1967, the equivalent medal that Canadians received was the George Cross, of which ten were awarded in Canada: eight military, one merchant navy, and one civilian.

The Cross of Valour became the centre of a controversy in 2007, when it was announced from the Chancellery of Honours at the Governor General of Canada's residence, Rideau Hall, that deceased Cobourg, Ontario, police constable Chris Garrett would not be awarded the honour. Garett died on duty after an individual lured him with a false 9-1-1 call and then cut his throat; however, Garett, as he was dying, shot and disabled the assailant, thereby preventing other planned attacks. But, because Garett's nominator waited until the trial for the constable's murderer was concluded, the application arrived at Rideau Hall eight months past the stipulated two-year deadline. After a public outcry, the Governor General-in-Council adjusted the rules of application for the Cross of Valour. Garrett was granted the Star of Courage.

Design
The medal is a cross of four equal limbs rendered in gold, with the obverse enameled in red and edged with gold, and bearing at the centre a gold maple leaf surrounded by a gold laurel wreath. On the reverse is the Royal Cypher of the reigning Canadian sovereign and a crown above, on the upper arm, while the words VALOUR • VAILLANCE are etched below, extending along the upper edge of the two lateral arms of the cross. The recipient's name and the date of the incident for which they are being honoured are engraved underneath the motto. This medallion is worn  by men, suspended from a red ribbon around the neck; and by women, below the left shoulder suspended from a red ribbon fashioned into a bow; a miniature cross may be worn on the ribbon bar in undress. Should an individual already possessing a Cross of Valour be awarded the medal again for subsequent valourous acts, he or she is granted a gold maple leaf to be carried on the same ring from which the original cross is hung; no bars have been issued to date.

Eligibility
Anyone may nominate or be nominated for receipt of the Cross of Valour; the incident need not take place in Canada, but Canadian people and/or interests must be involved. The decoration may be awarded posthumously, though nominations must be made no later than two years following either the act of bravery itself or the conclusion of any coroner's or court's inquest into the events for which the person was nominated.

Recipients
 Vaino Olavi Partanen , posthumously awarded 20 July 1972
 Lewis John Stringer , posthumously awarded 20 July 1972
 Mary Dohey , awarded 1 December 1975
 Kenneth Wilfrid Bishop , awarded 5 April 1976
 Jean Swedberg , posthumously awarded 17 May 1976
 Thomas Hynes , posthumously awarded 11 September 1978
 François Emeric Gaston Langelier , awarded 2 April 1979
 Amédéo Garrammone , awarded 28 January 1980
 Lester Robert Fudge , awarded 6 April 1981
 Harold Gilbert Miller , awarded 6 April 1981
 Martin Sceviour , awarded 6 April 1981
 Anna Ruth Lang , awarded 7 June 1982
 Robert Gordon Teather , awarded 25 April 1983
 René Marc Jalbert , awarded 16 July 1984
 David Gordon Cheverie , awarded 13 June 1988
 John Wendell MacLean , posthumously awarded 30 October 1992
 Douglas Fader , awarded 16 June 1994
 Keith Paul Mitchell , awarded 11 February 1998
 Bryan Keith Pierce , awarded 11 February 1998
 Leslie Arthur Palmer , awarded 4 May 2006

See also
 Canadian order of precedence (decorations and medals)
 State decoration

References

Further reading

External links

 
 
 
 

 
 

Civil awards and decorations of Canada

Courage awards
Awards established in 1972
1972 establishments in Canada